The 1992 Kansas City Royals season  was a season in American baseball. It involved the Royals finishing 5th in the American League West with a record of 72 wins and 90 losses.

Offseason
 December 9, 1991: Wally Joyner signed as a free agent with the Kansas City Royals.
December 10, 1991: Rico Rossy was traded by the Atlanta Braves to the Kansas City Royals for Bobby Moore.
 December 11, 1991: Kevin McReynolds was traded by the New York Mets with Gregg Jefferies and Keith Miller to the Kansas City Royals for Bret Saberhagen and Bill Pecota.
March 10, 1992: Kirk Gibson was traded by the Kansas City Royals to the Pittsburgh Pirates for Neal Heaton.

Regular season

Season standings

Record vs. opponents

Notable transactions
April 3, 1992: Josías Manzanillo was signed as a free agent with the Kansas City Royals.
June 1, 1992: Johnny Damon was drafted by the Kansas City Royals in the 1st round (35th pick) of the 1992 amateur draft. Player signed June 23, 1992.
July 21, 1992: Mark Davis was traded by the Kansas City Royals to the Atlanta Braves for Juan Berenguer.
August 6, 1992: Juan Samuel was signed as a free agent with the Kansas City Royals.

Roster

Player stats

Batting

Starters by position
Note: Pos = Position; G = Games played; AB = At bats; H = Hits; Avg. = Batting average; HR = Home runs; RBI = Runs batted in

Other batters
Note: G = Games played; AB = At bats; H = Hits; Avg. = Batting average; HR = Home runs; RBI = Runs batted in

Pitching

Starting pitchers 
Note: G = Games pitched; IP = Innings pitched; W = Wins; L = Losses; ERA = Earned run average; SO = Strikeouts

Other pitchers 
Note: G = Games pitched; IP = Innings pitched; W = Wins; L = Losses; ERA = Earned run average; SO = Strikeouts

Relief pitchers 
Note: G = Games pitched; W = Wins; L = Losses; SV = Saves; ERA = Earned run average; SO = Strikeouts

Farm system 

LEAGUE CHAMPIONS: GCL Royals

Notes

References
1992 Kansas City Royals at Baseball Reference
1992 Kansas City Royals at Baseball Almanac

Kansas City Royals seasons
Kansas City Royals season
Kansas